Tir-Phil is a village near the town of New Tredegar in the Caerphilly county borough of south Wales.

The village of Tir-Phil and New Tredegar itself are served by  Tir-Phil railway station.

Tir-Phil was also an electoral ward to Rhymney Valley District Council between 1973 and the council's dissolution in 1996.

References

Villages in Caerphilly County Borough